Chorlton and the Wheelies is an animated children's television series that ran from 26 September 1976 until 17 December 1978 on the British television channel ITV. 40 episodes were produced. The show followed the adventures of Chorlton, a fictional happiness dragon, in Wheelie World.

Chorlton and the Wheelies was created by Cosgrove Hall Films for Thames Television and broadcast on the ITV network. 

The eponymous lead character gets his name from the suburb of Manchester in which the Cosgrove Hall studio was based: the legend "Made in Chorlton-cum-Hardy" is found written on the inside of the egg from which he hatches in the very first episode of the series.

Synopsis

The series takes place in "Wheelie World", which is inhabited principally by the "wheelies", a race of anthropomorphic creatures who locomote by means of wheels. They have three wheels each: two large ones at the front (resembling feet), and a smaller centred one at the back (resembling a tail). The wheels are replaceable, and suitable wheels grow on vegetation found in Wheelie World.

The wheelies are in conflict with Fenella the Kettle Witch, an evil witch who speaks in a very strong Welsh accent and lives in Wheelie World but separately from the wheelies, in Spout Hall, an oversized kettle. Fenella hates happiness, and uses her powers primarily to make the wheelies unhappy. She has magical capabilities, including a form of teleportation which is her main mode of transport, and enchanted assistants including a magic book called 'Claptrap Von Spilldebeans' (who helps concoct her spells) and O'Reilly the Telescope, which gives her advice her on magic.  Minions include spikers (sinister looking objects like conker shells with baleful eyes, which roll everywhere) and toadies (pointed toadstools with similar eyes, which travel by bobbing through the ground as though it were water and who speak with a Chinese accent).

The wheelies have adopted into their society a "happiness dragon", Chorlton, who appears in Wheelie World at the very beginning of the series, hatching out of an egg.  Chorlton is perpetually good-natured and perpetually clueless.  For example, he fails to perceive Fenella as a villain,  and affectionately refers to her as a "little old lady".  Nevertheless, his presence negates the unhappiness magic, so the wheelies treat him as a hero. Being "Made in Chorlton-cum-Hardy" (Greater Manchester) he has a strong Lancashire accent, although this is probably due to the voice talents of Joe Lynch more than any planning by Cosgrove Hall.

Development
Plots are extremely simple, mainly revolve around Fenella's schemes to make the wheelies unhappy and Chorlton's accidental rectification of everything that goes wrong.  Around these events, the characters' simple and exaggerated personalities are on show.

The idea of 'wheelies' came about after the difficulties of moving many different characters using stop-frame animation. Characters on wheels were easier to manipulate than those with legs that needed fractionally moving many times for each second of filming. Similarly, choosing teleportation as Fenella's principal means of transportation means that usually Chorlton is the only character whose walking needs to be animated.

The show was sold to numerous countries around the (non-Wheelie) world. However Israel declined to purchase it as a graphic artist mistakenly drew a Star of David instead of a Pentagram on the front of the German-accented spellbook, causing accusations of antisemitism towards the programme's creators.

Characters
The characters include, amongst others:
Chorlton the Happiness Dragon - where he goes, happiness follows. His catchphrase is "Bye bye, little old lady!" at the end of every episode.
Fenella Fellorick, the Kettle Witch - who does not like anyone to enjoy themselves.
Zoomer - a wheelie boy, notable for his speed of locomotion.
Jenny - a wheelie girl with blonde hair who fancies Chorlton.
King Otto and Queen Doris - The monarchy of Wheelieworld.
The Minister of wheel estate - the political wheelie, who bears a striking resemblance to Harold Wilson, who had recently been Prime Minister of the UK. His real name is revealed to be Arthur in season 3.
Claptrap von Spilldebeans - A German spellbook who often speaks in rhyme and comes up with Fenella's schemes.
O'Reilly the one eyed telescope - An Irish telescope that Fenella stole from the end of Dún Laoghaire East pier.
Clifford - Fenella's giant son & Queenie's giant nephew, who is so tall the only part of him that ever is in shot is his leg.
Pablo Perdito - A world famous Latin American dancing duck.
Floyd - The only toady to have pink spots rather than green (first called by name in the series two episode "Toady Trouble" - possible hidden reference to the band Pink Floyd).
Queenie Fellorick the Pink Suit - Fenella's sister, but who does not like anyone to enjoy themselves.

Joe Lynch narrated the show as well as providing all the voices for the characters and the show's theme tune was written and sung by Joe Griffiths.

Episodes

Credits
Narrator: Joe Lynch (UK version)
Written by: Brian Trueman
Music: Joe Griffiths
Animation: Joe Dembinski, Jackie Cockle
Props: Chris Walker
Original Storyline: Jo Kemp
Camera: Jim Noble
Editing: Dave Street
Executive Producer: John Hambley
Produced by: Brian Cosgrove, Mark Hall
Directed by: Chris Taylor
Cosgrove-Hall Productions MCMLXXVI-MCMLXXIX
Thames Colour Production

References

External links

British children's animated fantasy television series
Chorlten and the Wheelies
1976 British television series debuts
1979 British television series endings
1970s British children's television series
Television shows produced by Thames Television
ITV children's television shows
Television series by Fremantle (company)
Television series by FremantleMedia Kids & Family
English-language television shows
1970s British animated television series
Television series by Cosgrove Hall Films